Barusia is a genus of Balkan Leptonetids that was first described by J. Kratochvíl in 1978.

Species
 it contains five species:
Barusia hofferi (Kratochvíl, 1935) – Montenegro
Barusia insulana (Kratochvíl & Miller, 1939) – Croatia
Barusia korculana (Kratochvíl & Miller, 1939) – Croatia
Barusia laconica (Brignoli, 1974) – Greece
Barusia maheni (Kratochvíl & Miller, 1939) (type) – Croatia

See also
 List of Leptonetidae species

References

Araneomorphae genera
Leptonetidae